The 1999 Men's Al-Ahram World Team Squash Championships were held in Egypt and took place from September 17 until September 22, 1999.

Seeds

Results

Pool A

Pool B

Pool C

Pool D 

Note*
Scotland were missing the world champion Peter Nicol and world semi-finalist Martin Heath who both refused to play quoting lack of financial assistance.

Quarter-finals

Semi-finals

Third Place Play Off

Final

References

See also 
World Team Squash Championships
World Squash Federation
World Open (squash)

World Squash Championships
Squash tournaments in Egypt
International sports competitions hosted by Egypt
Squash
Men